Three Friends is a South Korean drama/sitcom. It was first broadcast on MBC (Korean language version only). It ran from February 14, 2000 to April 16, 2001, airing 58 episodes.

Cast
Kim Hyun-sung - Kim Tae-moo
Hee Suk-jung - Cho Se-in
Jang Won-lee - Gong Seung-ho
Young Soo-kim - Cho Se-in's father
Hwa Young-kim - Cho Se-in's mother
So-hee Cho - Cho Se-in's sister
Jin Soo-hyun - Mi-Kyung
Sang-kyu Choi - Gong Seung-ho's father
Hyun-jung - Kim Tae-moo's father
Sun Hee-lee - Gong Seung-ho's sister
Sang Hyun-kim - Gong Seung-ho's brother
Ung-heo - Gong Seung-ho's brother
Young Sook-lee - Flower-shop proprietor
Jin-kwan-cho - Video shop owner
Jeong Shik-kim - Comic-magazine editor
Choi Su-rin as Jung
In Gyo-jin as Restaurant waiter

Notes

2000 South Korean television series debuts
2001 South Korean television series endings